SplA/ryanodine receptor domain and SOCS box containing 3 is a protein that in humans is encoded by the SPSB3 gene.

References

External links

Further reading 

 
 
 
 
 

Genes on human chromosome 16